Robin Rhode (born 1976) is a South African artist based in Berlin. He has made wall drawings, photographs and sculptures.

Education 
Rhode was born in Cape Town, South Africa. He studied fine art at Technikon Witwatersrand in Johannesburg (now the University of Johannesburg), followed by postgraduate work in 2000 at the South African School of Motion Picture Medium and Live Performance.

Work 

Rhode is represented by Lehmann Maupin.

In November 2009 he provided stop-frame video animations for a performance by Leif Ove Andsnes of Mussorgsky's Pictures at an Exhibition at the Lincoln Center in New York.

In 2014 he directed a music video for the U2 single "Every Breaking Wave"; it includes stop-frame animation stencil drawings, and figures which interact with them.

Exhibitions and performances 

 Fresh, South African National Gallery, Cape Town, South Africa (2000, Performance)
 The Score, Artists Space, New York (2004, Performance)
 Street Smart, Rubell Family Collection, Miami (2005, solo exhibition)
 Empieza el Juego, Zaragoza, Madrid (2006, solo exhibition)
 The Storyteller, FRAC Champagne-Ardenne, France (2006, solo exhibition)
 All About Laughter: The Role of Humour in Contemporary Art, Mori Art Museum, Tokyo (2007, Performance)
 Walk Off, Haus der Kunst, Munich, Germany (2007, solo exhibition)
 Who Saw Who, Hayward Gallery, London, UK, (2008, solo exhibition)
 Catch Air: Robin Rhode, The Wexner Center for the Arts, Columbus, Ohio (2009, solo exhibition)
 Robin Rhode and Leif Ove Andsnes: Pictures Reframed, Lincoln Center, New York (2009, Performance)
 Robin Rhode, Los Angeles County Museum of Art (2010, solo exhibition)
 Paries Pictus, Castello di Rivoli, Turin, Italy (2011, solo exhibition)
 The Call of Walls, National Gallery of Victoria, Melbourne, Australia (2013, solo exhibition)
 Animating the Everyday, Neuberger Museum of Art, Purchase College, State University of New York (2014, solo exhibition)
 The Sudden Walk, Stockholm, Sweden (2015, solo exhibition and performance)
 Drawing Waves, Drawing Center, New York (2015, solo exhibition)
 Robin Rhode: Robin Rhode, North Carolina Museum of Art, USA (September 2015, solo exhibition)
 Arnold Schönberg's Erwartung in partnership with Performa, Wet Ink Ensemble conducted by Arturo Tamayo, Times Square, New York (November 7 & 8, 2015)
 The Moon is Asleep, SCAD Museum of Art, Savannah, Georgia, USA (February 2016, solo exhibition and performance)
 Under the Sun, Tel Aviv Museum of Art, Israel (2017, solo exhibition)
 A Plan of the Soul, Haus Konstruktiv, Zürich, Switzerland (October 2018, solo exhibition and performance)
 Memory Is the Weapon, Krems an der Donau, Austria (2020)
 Museum Voorlinden, Wassenaar, The Netherlands (2021)

 Reception 

In 2018 he won the Zurich Art Prize. Examples of his work are held by the Museum of Modern Art in New York, the Detroit Institute of Arts in Detroit, Michigan, and the Solomon R. Guggenheim Museum in New York.

References

 Further reading 
 Robin Rhode: Walk Off. André Lepecki, edited by Stephanie Rosenthal, Ostfildern-Ruit: Hatje Cantz 2007.
 Street Level. Mark Bradford, William Cordova, and Robin Rhode, edited by Trevor Schoonmaker. Exhibition catalogue. Durham: Nasher Museum of Art at Duke University, 2007.
 Street Art, Street Life. Edited by Linda Yee. Exhibition catalogue. New York: Aperture/Bronx Museum of the Arts, 2008.
 Robin Rhode: Who Saw Who. Michele Robecchi, Stephanie Rosenthal and James Sey. Exhibition catalogue. London: Hayward Gallery, 2008.
 Catch Air: Robin Rhode. Catharina Manchanda and Claire Tancons, edited by Ann Bremner and Ryan Shafer, 2009.
 Leif Ove Andsnes and Robin Rhode: Pictures Reframed. 2009.
 Robin Rhode: Variants. Edited by Honey Luard. Exhibition catalogue. London: White Cube, 2011.
 Robin Rhode: Paries Pictus. Edited by Sophie Perryer. Exhibition catalogue. Cape Town: Stevenson Gallery, 2013.
 Robin Rhode: The Call of Walls. Maggie Finch, edited by Mark Gomes. Exhibition catalogue. Melbourne: National Gallery of Victoria, 2013.
 Robin Rhode: Animating the Everyday. Helaine Posner and Louise Posner. Exhibition catalogue. New York: Neuberger Museum of Art of Purchase College, 2014.
 Robin Rhode: Tension''. Text by Andrea Bellini, Michele Robecchi. Published by Hatje Cantz, 2016.

External links
 

1976 births
Living people
South African performance artists
Artists from Cape Town
South African contemporary artists